Paspalum repens, known as horsetail paspalum or water paspalum, is a species of grass native to South America, Central America, and North America. It is often called Paspalum fluitans, though this name is treated as a synonym of P. repens in Kew's Plants of the World Online database and the Flora of North America project.

References

repens
Flora of South America
Flora of North America